IBM Power microprocessors (originally POWER prior to Power10) are designed and sold by IBM for servers and supercomputers. The name "POWER" was originally presented as an acronym for "Performance Optimization With Enhanced RISC". The Power line of microprocessors has been used in IBM's RS/6000, AS/400, pSeries, iSeries, System p, System i, and Power Systems lines of servers and supercomputers. They have also been used in data storage devices and workstations by IBM and by other server manufacturers like Bull and Hitachi.

The Power family was originally developed in the late 1980s, and remains under active development. In the beginning, they implemented the POWER instruction set architecture (ISA), which evolved into PowerPC and later into Power ISA. In August 2019, IBM announced it would open source the Power ISA. As part of the move, it was also announced that administration of the OpenPOWER Foundation will now be handled by the Linux Foundation.

History

Early developments

The 801 research project

In 1974 IBM started a project to build a telephone switching computer that required, for the time, immense computational power. Since the application was comparably simple, this machine would need only to perform I/O, branches, add register-register, move data between registers and memory, and would have no need for special instructions to perform heavy arithmetic. This simple design philosophy, whereby each step of a complex operation is specified explicitly by one machine instruction, and all instructions are required to complete in the same constant time, would later come to be known as RISC. When the telephone switch project was canceled, IBM retained the design for the general purpose processor and named it 801 after building #801 at Thomas J. Watson Research Center.

The Cheetah project 
By 1982 IBM continued to explore the superscalar limits of the 801 design by using multiple execution units to improve performance to determine if a RISC machine could maintain multiple instructions per cycle. Many changes were made to the 801 design to allow for multiple execution units and the Cheetah processor has separate units for branch prediction, fixed-point, and floating-point execution. By 1984 CMOS was chosen because it allows improved circuit integration and transistor-logic performance.

The America project
In 1985, research on a second-generation RISC architecture started at the IBM Thomas J. Watson Research Center, producing the "AMERICA architecture". In 1986, IBM Austin started developing the RS/6000 series computers based on that architecture. This was to become the first POWER processors using the first POWER ISA.

POWER

The first IBM computers to incorporate the POWER ISA are the RISC System/6000 or RS/6000 series.  They were released in February 1990. These RS/6000 computers were divided into two classes, POWERstation workstations and POWERserver servers. The first RS/6000 CPU has 2 configurations, called the "RIOS-1" and "RIOS.9" (or more commonly the POWER1 CPU). A RIOS-1 configuration has a total of 10 discrete chips: an instruction cache chip, fixed-point chip, floating-point chip, 4 data L1 cache chips, storage control chip, input/output chips, and a clock chip. The lower cost RIOS.9 configuration has 8 discrete chips: an instruction cache chip, fixed-point chip, floating-point chip, 2 data cache chips, storage control chip, input/output chip, and a clock chip.

The POWER1 is the first microprocessor that used register renaming and out-of-order execution. A simplified and less powerful version of the 10 chip RIOS-1 was made in 1992, for lower-end RS/6000s. It uses only one chip and is called RISC Single Chip or RSC.

POWER1 processors
 RIOS-1 the original 10-chip version
 RIOS.9 a less powerful version of RIOS-1
 POWER1+ a faster version of RIOS-1 made on a reduced fabrication process
 POWER1++ an even faster version of RIOS-1
 RSC a single-chip implementation of RIOS-1
 RAD6000 a radiation-hardened version of the RSC was made available for primarily use in space; it was a very popular design and was used extensively on many high-profile missions

POWER2

IBM started the POWER2 processor effort as a successor to the POWER1. By adding a second fixed-point unit, a second powerful floating point unit, and other performance enhancements and new instructions to the design, the POWER2 ISA had leadership performance when it was announced in November 1993. The POWER2 was a multi-chip design, but IBM also made a single chip design of it, called the POWER2 Super Chip or P2SC that went into high performance servers and supercomputers. At the time of its introduction in 1996, the P2SC was the largest processor with the highest transistor count in the industry and was a leader in floating point operations.

POWER2 processors
 POWER2 6 to 8 chips were mounted on a ceramic multi chip module
 POWER2+ a cheaper 6-chip version of POWER2 with support for external L2 caches
 P2SC a faster and single chip version of POWER2
 P2SC+ an even faster version or P2SC due to reduced fabrication process

PowerPC

In 1991, Apple looked for a future alternative to the CISC-based Motorola 68000 series platform, and Motorola experimented with a RISC platform of its own, the 88000. IBM joined the discussion and the three founded the AIM alliance to build the PowerPC ISA, heavily based on the POWER ISA, but with additions from both Apple and Motorola. It was to be a complete 32/64 bit RISC architecture, and to range from very low end embedded microcontrollers to the very high end supercomputer and server applications.

After two years of development, the resulting PowerPC ISA was introduced in 1993. A modified version of the RSC architecture, PowerPC added single-precision floating point instructions and general register-to-register multiply and divide instructions, and removed some POWER features. It also added a 64-bit version of the ISA and support for SMP.

The Amazon project

In 1990, IBM wanted to merge the low end server and mid range server architectures, the RS/6000 RISC ISA and AS/400 CISC ISA into one common RISC ISA that could host both IBM's AIX and OS/400 operating systems. The existing POWER and the upcoming PowerPC ISAs were deemed unsuitable by the AS/400 team so an extension to the 64-bit PowerPC instruction set was developed called PowerPC AS for Advances Series or Amazon Series. Later, additions from the RS/6000 team and AIM Alliance PowerPC were included, and by 2001, with the introduction of POWER4, they were all joined into one instruction set architecture: the PowerPC v.2.0.

POWER3

The POWER3 began as PowerPC 630, a successor of the commercially unsuccessful PowerPC 620. It uses a combination of the POWER2 ISA and the 32/64-bit PowerPC ISA set with support for SMP and single-chip implementation. It was used to great extent in IBM's RS/6000 computers, and the second generation version, the POWER3-II, is the first commercially available processor from IBM using copper interconnects. The POWER3 is the last processor to use a POWER instruction set, and all subsequent models use the PowerPC instruction sets.

POWER3 processors
 POWER3 – Introduced in 1998, it combined the POWER and PowerPC instruction sets.
 POWER3-II – A faster POWER3 fabricated on a reduced size, copper based process.

POWER4

The POWER4 merged the 32/64 bit PowerPC instruction set and the 64-bit PowerPC AS instruction set from the Amazon project to the new PowerPC v.2.0 specification, unifying IBM's RS/6000 and AS/400 families of computers. Besides the unification of the different platforms, POWER4 was also designed to reach very high frequencies and have large on-die L2 caches. It is the first commercially available multi-core processor and came in single-die versions as well as in four-chip multi-chip modules. In 2002, IBM also made a cost- and feature-reduced version of the POWER4 called PowerPC 970 by Apple's request.

POWER4 processors
 POWER4 – The first dual core microprocessor and the first PowerPC processor to reach beyond 1 GHz.
 POWER4+ – A faster POWER4 fabricated on a reduced process.

POWER5

The POWER5 processors built on the popular POWER4 and incorporated simultaneous multithreading into the design, a technology pioneered in the PowerPC AS based RS64-III processor, and on-die memory controllers. It was designed for multiprocessing on a massive scale and came in multi-chip modules with onboard large L3 cache chips.

POWER5 processors
 POWER5 – The iconic setup with four POWER5 chips and four L3 cache chips on a large multi-chip module.
 POWER5+ – A faster POWER5 fabricated on a reduced process mainly to reduce power consumption.

Power ISA

A joint organization was founded in 2004 called Power.org with the mission to unify and coordinate future development of the PowerPC specifications. By then, the PowerPC specification was fragmented since Freescale (née Motorola) and IBM had taken different paths in their respective development of it. Freescale had prioritized 32-bit embedded applications and IBM high-end servers and supercomputers. There was also a collection of licensees of the specification like AMCC, Synopsys, Sony, Microsoft, P.A. Semi, CRAY, and Xilinx that needed coordination. The joint effort was not only to streamline development of the technology but also to streamline marketing.

The new instruction set architecture was called Power ISA and merged the PowerPC v.2.02 from the POWER5 with the PowerPC Book E specification from Freescale as well as some related technologies like the Vector-Media Extensions known under the brand name AltiVec (also called VMX by IBM) and hardware virtualization. This new ISA was called 'Power ISA v.2.03 and POWER6 was the first high end processor from IBM to use it. Older POWER and PowerPC specifications did not make the cut and those instruction sets were henceforth deprecated for good. There is no active development on any processor type today that uses these older instruction sets.

POWER6

POWER6 was the fruit of the ambitious eCLipz Project, joining the I (AS/400), P (RS/6000) and Z (Mainframe) instruction sets under one common platform. I and P was already joined with the POWER4, but the eCLipz effort failed to include the CISC based z/Architecture and where the z10 processor became POWER6's eCLipz sibling. , a separate line of processors implementing z/Architecture continue to be developed by IBM, with the latest being the IBM Telum.

Because of eCLipz, the POWER6 is an unusual design as it aimed for very high frequencies and sacrificed out-of-order execution, something that has been a feature for POWER and PowerPC processors since their inception. POWER6 also introduced the decimal floating point unit to the Power ISA, something it shares with z/Architecture.

With the POWER6, in 2008 IBM merged the former System p and System i server and workstation families into one family called Power Systems. Power Systems machines can run different operating systems like AIX, Linux, and IBM i.

POWER6 processors
 POWER6 – Reached 5 GHz; comes in modules with a single chip on it, and in MCM with two L3 cache chips.
 POWER6+ – A minor update, fabricated on the same process as POWER6.

POWER7

The POWER7 symmetric multiprocessor design was a substantial evolution from the POWER6 design, focusing more on power efficiency through multiple cores, simultaneous multithreading (SMT), out-of-order execution and large on-die eDRAM L3 caches. The eight-core chip could execute 32 threads in parallel, and has a mode in which it could disable cores to reach higher frequencies for the ones that are left. It uses a new high-performance floating point unit called VSX that merges the functionality of the traditional FPU with AltiVec. Even while the POWER7 run at lower frequencies than POWER6, each POWER7 core performs faster than its POWER6 counterpart.

POWER7 processors
 POWER7 – Comes in single-chip modules or in quad-chip MCM-configurations for supercomputer applications.
 POWER7+ – Scaled down fabrication process, and increased L3 cache and frequency.

POWER8 

POWER8 is a 4 GHz, 12 core processor with 8 hardware threads per core for a total of 96 threads of parallel execution. It uses 96 MB of eDRAM L3 cache on chip and 128 MB off-chip L4 cache and a new extension bus called CAPI that runs on top of PCIe, replacing the older GX bus. The CAPI bus can be used to attach dedicated off-chip accelerator chips such as GPUs, ASICs and FPGAs. IBM states that it is two to three times as fast as its predecessor, the POWER7.

It was first built on a 22 nanometer process in 2014. In December 2012, IBM began submitting patches to the 3.8 version of the Linux kernel, to support new POWER8 features including the VSX-2 instructions.

POWER9 

IBM spent much time designing the POWER9 processor according to William Starke, a systems architect for the POWER8 processor. The POWER9 is the first to incorporate elements of the Power ISA version 3.0 that was released in December 2015, including the VSX-3 instructions, and also incorporates support for Nvidia's NVLink bus technology.

The United States Department of Energy together with Oak Ridge National Laboratory and Lawrence Livermore National Laboratory contracted IBM and Nvidia to build two supercomputers, the Sierra and the Summit, based on POWER9 processors coupled with Nvidia's Volta GPUs. The Sierra went online in 2017 and the Summit in 2018.

POWER9, which was launched in 2017, is manufactured using a 14 nm FinFET process, and comes in four versions, two 24 core SMT4 versions intended to use PowerNV for scale up and scale out applications, and two 12 core SMT8 versions intended to use PowerVM for scale-up and scale-out applications. Possibly there will be more versions in the future since the POWER9 architecture is open for licensing and modification by the OpenPOWER Foundation members.

Power10 

Power10 is a CPU introduced in September 2021.  It is built on a 7 nm technology.

Devices

See also 
 IBM OpenPower
 OpenPOWER Foundation

References

External links 
 IBM Announces $1 Billion Linux Investment for Power Systems (LWN.net)

IBM microprocessors